Louis Harris MBE (1896–1975) was an English rugby league footballer.

Harris played 255-matches and scored 76-tries, and 1-conversion for 230-points for Hull Kingston Rovers, including in the Challenge Cup in 1925, and were Northern Rugby Football Union champions in 1921 and 1923. He played 1919-1929 for Rovers, and was later a club coach and advisor, and a boardroom Director.

Harris was awarded MBE in 1969 for work with the Great War Trust. He was Jewish.  The Jews were the first significant minority group to play rugby in Britain.

Challenge Cup Final appearances 
Lewis Harris played  in Hull Kingston Rovers' 3–16 defeat by Oldham in the 1924–25 Challenge Cup Final during the 1924–25 season at Headingley Rugby Stadium, Leeds on Saturday 25 April 1925, in front of a crowd of 28,335.

See also
List of select Jewish rugby league players

References
 Encyclopedia Judaica, Second Edition, volume 19, p. 146

1896 births
1975 deaths
English Jews
English rugby league players
Jewish rugby league players
Rugby league players from Kingston upon Hull
Hull Kingston Rovers players
Hull Kingston Rovers coaches
Place of death missing